Buthoidea is the largest superfamily of scorpions. Its members are known as fat-tailed scorpions and bark scorpions. A few very large genera (Ananteris, Centruroides, Compsobuthus, or Tityus) are known, but a high number of species-poor or monotypic ones also exist. They occur in the warmer parts of every major landmass on Earth, except on New Zealand. The superfamily was established by Carl Ludwig Koch in 1837.

Taxonomy
Five families are placed into Buthoidea, two extant families Buthidae and Microcharmidae, plus three extinct families.

†Archaeobuthidae (Lebanese amber, Hauterivian)
Buthidae (Modern, Cenomanian - Recent)
Microcharmidae (Modern, Recent)
†Palaeoburmesebuthidae (Burmese amber, Cenomanian)
†Protobuthidae ( Grès à Voltzia Formation, Anisian)
†Sucinlourencoidae (Burmese amber, Cenomanian)

References

Arachnid superfamilies
Scorpion taxonomy
Taxa named by Carl Ludwig Koch